Griposia aprilina, the merveille du jour, is a moth of the family Noctuidae. The species was first described by Carl Linnaeus in his 1758 10th edition of Systema Naturae. It ranges from Sardinia and south-east Russia (foothills of the Ural mountains to the Black Sea) from the southernmost part of Norway and Saint Petersburg through northern and central Europe to southern France and northern Italy, as well as in Castile. Also in western and central Anatolia and the Caucasus. Also in Asia minor. There is recent evidence from the Alborz mountain range.

Technical description and variation

Forewing whitish green; lines and markings velvety black, the median shade especially thick; upper stigmata large; all the black markings emphasised by white; hindwing blackish grey; the cellspot, outer line, and submarginal shade darker; a white terminal space before the black marginal line; the ab. bouveti Lucas, from France, has the head, thorax, and forewings greener, the median area of forewing without black markings.

Biology
The moth flies in September and October.

Larva greenish black, with a fulvous tinge; a dorsal series of dark medallions; dorsal line pale, interrupted, with black edges; spiracular line pale like the venter. The larvae feed internally on the flowers and leaves of oak trees.

References

External links

Merveille du Jour (Griposia aprilina) on UKmoths
Griposia aprilina on Norfolkmoths.co.uk
Griposia aprilina on Fauna Europaea
Griposia aprilina on Lepiforum.de 
Griposia aprilina on Vlindernet.nl 

Noctuidae
Moths described in 1758
Moths of Europe
Moths of Asia
Taxa named by Carl Linnaeus